Piz Toissa is a mountain of the Oberhalbstein Alps, located west of Salouf in the canton of Graubünden.

Panorama

Gallery

References

External links

 Piz Toissa on Hikr

Mountains of the Alps
Mountains of Graubünden
Mountains of Switzerland
Surses